Vernon Harris (26 February 1905 – February 1999) was a British screenwriter. He often worked with the film director Lewis Gilbert. Harris was nominated for an Academy Award for Best Adapted Screenplay for his script for film Oliver! (1968).

Harris was born in Folkestone. He worked extensively for radio at the BBC, notably on PC49 and Band Waggon. He died in Surrey.

Credits

Screenwriter
 Play Up the Band (1935)
 Joy Ride (1935) - also story
 The Improper Duchess (1936)
Tropical Trouble (1936)
Band Waggon (1940) - also devised by
The Adventures of PC 49 (1949) - based on radio series
 A Case for PC 49 (1951) - also based on radio series
 Emergency Call (1952) aka The Hundred Hour Hunt
 There Was a Young Lady (1953) - original story
Cosh Boy (1953) aka The Slasher
 Albert R.N. (1953) aka Break to Freedom
 The Good Die Young (1954)
 The Sea Shall Not Have Them (1954)
 Reach for the Sky (1956) - additional scenes
 Three Men in a Boat (1956, joint nomination with Hubert Gregg for BAFTA Award for Best British Screenplay)
 The Admirable Crichton (1957) aka Paradise Lagoon
 Carve Her Name with Pride (1958)
A Cry from the Streets (1958) (nomination for BAFTA Award for Best British Screenplay)
Ferry to Hong Kong (1959)
Light Up the Sky! (1960)
 Almost Angels (1962)
 Emergency (1962)
 Oliver! (1968 - 1969 nominee for Academy Award for Writing Adapted Screenplay)
Friends (1971)
Paul and Michelle (1974)

As script editor
The Adventurers (1970) 
Seven Nights in Japan (1976) 
The Spy Who Loved Me (1977) 
Moonraker (1979) 
Educating Rita (1983)

Storyboard artist
Shirley Valentine (1989)

Actor
Joy Ride (1935)
 Show Flat (1936)
Tropical Trouble (1936)
Farewell Again  (1937)
The Claydon Treasure Mystery (1938)
The Last Barricade (1938)
The Gables Mystery (1938)

Radio Writer
Band Waggon (1938–40)
The Adventures of PC 49

References

External links

1905 births
1999 deaths
People from Folkestone
English male screenwriters
British storyboard artists
20th-century English screenwriters
20th-century English male writers